Salash Nunatak (‘Nunatak Salash’ \'nu-na-tak 'sa-lash\) is a rocky peak of elevation 220 m in Breznik Heights projecting from the upper Wulfila Glacier on Greenwich Island in the South Shetland Islands, Antarctica.  Situated 400 m southwest of the summit of Oborishte Ridge and 1.35 km west of Nevlya Peak.

The peak is named after the settlement of Salash in northwestern Bulgaria.

Location
Bulgarian topographic survey Tangra 2004/05 and mapping in 2009.

Map
L.L. Ivanov. Antarctica: Livingston Island and Greenwich, Robert, Snow and Smith Islands. Scale 1:120000 topographic map.  Troyan: Manfred Wörner Foundation, 2009.

References
 Salash Nunatak. SCAR Composite Gazetteer of Antarctica.
 Bulgarian Antarctic Gazetteer. Antarctic Place-names Commission. (details in Bulgarian, basic data in English)

External links
 Salash Nunatak. Copernix satellite image

Nunataks of Greenwich Island
Bulgaria and the Antarctic